The  is a  railway line in western Tokyo, Japan, owned by the private railway operator Keiō Corporation. It connects Shinjuku, Tokyo, with the suburban city of Hachiōji. The Keiō Line is part of a network with interchanges and through running to other lines of Keiō Corporation: the Keiō New Line, Keiō Sagamihara Line, the Keiō Keibajō Line, the Keiō Dōbutsuen Line, the Keiō Takao Line, and the  gauge Keiō Inokashira Line.

Services
Six different types of limited-stop services are operated on the Keiō Line, along with local trains. Destinations are from Shinjuku unless otherwise indicated. English abbreviations are tentative for this article.
 
Until 2001 it was called .
  (R)
 Most services for Hashimoto and Keiō-Tama-Center on the Sagamihara Line, and Takaosanguchi on the Takao Line
  (SeE)
 Most bound for on the Sagamihara Line. Until 2013, these were weekday-only services called .
  (E)
Most services run from the Toei Shinjuku Line locally and used as the express on the Sagamihara Line via Chōfu in mornings and evenings; other services in mornings and evenings are bound for Keiō-Hachiōji, Takaosanguchi and Takahatafudō.
  (SpE)
 Most services bound for Keiō-Hachiōji and Takaosanguchi can make the run from Shinjuku in 37 minutes and 39 minutes respectively.
 Mt. TAKAO (MT)
 Reserved-seat supplementary-fare services between Shinjuku and Takaosanguchi on the Takao Line. Services operate weekends and holidays with three round-trips. Trains to Takaosanguchi run nonstop after Meidaimae, while trains to Shinjuku make additional stops to receive passengers.
  (KL)
 Reserved-seat supplementary-fare services between Shinjuku and either Keiō-Hachiōji or Hashimoto. Services operate seven days a week, with services to Shinjuku in the morning and from Shinjuku in the evening. Fewer trains operate on weekends and holidays. On trains from Shinjuku, reserved seat tickets are only required up to the first train stop after Meidaimae, after which the train's seats become unreserved.

Stations 
 All stations are located in Tokyo.
 Local trains stop at all stations.

Legend:
● - all trains stop at this station
◇ - trains stop at this station during special events
▲ - Shinjuku-bound trains stop to pick up passengers
｜- all trains pass
R - Rapid; SeE - Semi Express; E - Express; SpE - Special Express; KL - Keiō Liner; MT - Mt.TAKAO

Events at stations marked with a "◇" symbol for which trains make special seasonal stops:
 Fuda Station: Chofu City Fireworks Festival
 Tobitakyū Station: Soccer games, concerts, etc. at Ajinomoto Stadium
 Higashi-Fuchū Station: Events (including the Arima Kinen) at Tokyo Racecourse; transfer to the Keiō Keibajō Line
 Nakagawara Station: Seiseki-Tamagawa Fireworks Festival
 Mogusaen Station: Saturdays and holidays during the Plum Blossom Festival

History
The Shinjuku to Chōfu section opened in 1913 as a  gauge interurban line electrified at 600 V DC, and was progressively extended in both directions so that the line connected Shinjuku and Fuchu in 1916. The Sasazuka to Fuchu section was double-tracked between 1920 and 1923.

The extension to Higashi-Hachiōji (now Keiō-Hachiōji) was completed by a related company, Gyokunan Electric Railway, in 1925. The subsidy application was rejected on the basis that the line competed with the Japanese Government Railways (JGR) Chūō Main Line, and so the Gyokunan Electric Railway merged with the Keiō Electric Railway Co., the line was regauged to 1,372 mm, and operation of trains from Shinjuku to Higashi-Hachiōji commenced in 1928.

The Fuchu to Nakagawara and Seiseki-Sakuragaoka to Kitano sections were double-tracked in 1929. In 1963, the original terminus at Shinjuku and the streetrunning section on what is today Japan National Route 20 towards Sasazuka Station was moved to an underground alignment. Additionally the overhead line voltage was increased to 1,500 V DC. The Nakagawara to Seiseki-Sakuragaoka section was double-tracked in 1964. The Kitano to Keiō-Hachiōji section was double-tracked in 1970, and the relocation of the terminal station underground was completed in 1989.

From the start of the revised timetable introduced on 25 September 2015, Semi Special Express services were also to stop at Sasazuka and Chitose-Karasuyama stations, and Semi Express services will also stop at Sengawa Station.

The flat junction west of Chofu station between the Keiō Line and Keiō Sagamihara Line has been a source of congestion in the entire Keiō network for years. Keiō has reconfigured the station and put the entire junction and Chofu Station underground to improve operations and separate traffic between the two lines. The underground section of the Keiō around Chofu Station to Kokuryo was completed in 2012.

Level crossings and congestion 
The Keiō Line is infamous for its level crossings, of which the 25 lying on the  section between Sasazuka and Sengawa stations are classified by the Tokyo Metropolitan Government Construction Bureau as akazu no fumikiri as they are closed to road traffic for over 40 minutes in an hour. Congestion on the Keiō Line is also a concern, with trains often running as close as 1 minute apart during rush hours. In 2016, Keiō and the Tokyo Metropolitan Government Construction Bureau proposed that the section between Sasazuka and Chofu be grade separated and widened to quadruple-track to reduce the effects caused by the present bunching on the existing at-grade double-tracked line. Later the proposal evolved to call for two separate sets of tracks each dedicated to express and local services, similar to the Keiō and Keiō New lines between Sasazuka and Shinjuku Stations. 

With the completion of the undergrounding between Chofu and Kokuryo Stations in 2012, construction has started on elevating the line between Sasazuka and Sengawa Stations. The government has planned the grade-separating project for this section of line to be completed by 2022, but this date has been delayed due to land acquisition issues. 

Keiō has proposed later phase for the whole corridor involves building another underground set of tracks for express services between Sasazuka and Chofu, effectively quadruple tracking the corridor. The design of Chofu Station after the completion of the undergrounding works in 2012 allows for the inclusion of another set of underground express tracks in the future.

References
This article incorporates material from the corresponding article in the Japanese Wikipedia.

External links

 Keiō Corporation website 
 Keiō Corporation website 

Lines of Keio Corporation
Railway lines in Tokyo
4 ft 6 in gauge railways in Japan
Railway lines opened in 1913
1913 establishments in Japan